Adam Rocap (1854 - March 29, 1892) was a Major League Baseball player.

He was born in Philadelphia, Pennsylvania, where he died in 1892 from intestinal obstruction.

References

External links
Baseball Reference.com page

1854 births
1892 deaths
19th-century baseball players
Major League Baseball outfielders
Philadelphia Athletics (NA) players
Baseball players from Philadelphia
Indianapolis Blues (minor league) players
Albany (minor league baseball) players